Jeremy “JD” Deputat  (born December 2, 1976), is an American photographer and art director from Detroit, Michigan.

The Wayne State University graduate has worked with Kid Rock, Eminem, 50 Cent, Game, Reggie Bush, Anthony Bennett, Stephen Peterman, Olivier Francois, among others. His work has appeared in Rolling Stone, Vibe, Spin, XXL, Billboard, AdWeek, ESPN The Magazine and more. His commercial clients include Adidas, Atlantic Records, Interscope Records, Shady Records, Universal Music Group, Casio, Carhartt, Chrysler, Red Bull North America and more.

Deputat's first published book, titled I'm Kid Rock, What's Your Excuse?, was published in 2013.

External links
 Official Photography Site
 Mass Appeal, April 4, 2013
 Hypebeast, May 6, 2013
 E! Online, April 10, 2013
 New photo book goes behind the curtain with Kid Rock Detroit Free Press, April 2, 2013
  Interview with Jeremy Deputat Huffington Post, April 2, 2013

Selected books
I'm Kid Rock, What's Your Excuse?" (Detroit, 2013)

1976 births
Living people
American photographers
American art directors
Hip hop fashion
Wayne State University alumni
Artists from Detroit